Marcos Nunes (born 3 July 1992) is a Canadian soccer player.

Club career
He spent time in college with the Humber Hawks.

During 2013, he played with Brampton United.  During the winter break of the 2013–14 season he signed with Bosnian Premier League side NK Travnik where he played until summer 2014.

Nunes joined TFC Academy in June 2014, and played with the senior academy team in League1 Ontario.

He signed with Toronto FC II on March 27, 2015. He made his debut the next day against FC Montreal and scored a goal in the match off a free kick delivered by Molham Babouli. Toronto FC II won the match 0-2.

References

External links

1992 births
Living people
Association football forwards
Canadian soccer players
Canadian people of Portuguese descent
Canadian expatriate soccer players
Expatriate footballers in Bosnia and Herzegovina
Canadian expatriate sportspeople in Bosnia and Herzegovina
Brampton United players
NK Travnik players
Toronto FC players
Toronto FC II players
Canadian Soccer League (1998–present) players
Premier League of Bosnia and Herzegovina players
League1 Ontario players
USL Championship players
Blue Devils FC players
Woodbridge Strikers players
Soccer players from Brampton